Adenopodia is a genus of legume in the family Fabaceae, that occurs in the northern Neotropics and Africa. They may grow as lianas, shrubs or trees. The petioles have a distinct gland above their base, hence the Greek name which is a combination of "gland-" and "foot".

Species
It contains the following species: 
 Adenopodia gymnantha Brenan – western Mexico
 Adenopodia oaxacana M.Sousa – southern Mexico
 Adenopodia patens (Hook. & Arn.) Brenan – western Mexico & central America
 Adenopodia rotundifolia (Harms) Brenan – east Africa
 Adenopodia scelerata (A.Chev.) Brenan – west & central Africa
 Adenopodia schlechteri (Harms) Brenan – southeastern Africa
 Adenopodia spicata (E.Mey.) C.Presl – southern Africa

See also
 Piptadenia

References

Mimosoids
Taxonomy articles created by Polbot
Fabaceae genera